Trndez (also Tyarndarach and Candlemas Day) is a feast of purification in the Armenian Apostolic Church and Armenian Catholic Churches, celebrated 40 days after Jesus' birth. The two churches celebrate this on different days, the 13th (with celebrations on the eve of the 14th of February) and the 2nd of February. The celebration of the Trndez is Zoroastrian in origin and is originally connected with sun/fire worship in ancient pre-Christian Armenia, symbolizing the coming of spring and fertility.

See also
Chaharshanbe Suri

References

Observances in Armenia
Armenian festivals
Epiphany (holiday)
Armenian Apostolic Church
Armenian Catholic Church
February observances
Winter events in Armenia